Pavel Yawseenka (born 30 October 1980) is a Belarusian football coach and former player. As of 2017, he works as assistant coach at Shakhtyor Soligorsk.

Honours
Gomel
Belarusian Cup winner: 2010–11
Belarusian Super Cup winner: 2012

External links

1980 births
Living people
Belarusian footballers
FC Molodechno players
FC Kommunalnik Slonim players
FC Granit Mikashevichi players
FC Khimik Svetlogorsk players
FC Minsk players
FC Savit Mogilev players
FC Torpedo-BelAZ Zhodino players
FC Gomel players
FC Slavia Mozyr players
FC Torpedo Minsk players
Association football defenders
Footballers from Minsk